Josu Ozkoidi Alba (born 23 April 1990) is a Spanish footballer who plays for SD Amorebieta as a left back.

Club career
Born in San Sebastián, Gipuzkoa, Basque Country, Ozkoidi was a Real Sociedad youth graduate. An attacking midfielder, he made his senior debut with the reserves during the 2008–09 season, suffering relegation from Segunda División B.

On 19 August 2014, Ozkoidi joined SD Eibar and was immediately loaned to Real Unión in the third division, for one year. On 31 August of the following year, he signed a permanent two-year contract with the Txuribeltz.

On 19 July 2017, Ozkoidi moved to CE Sabadell FC still in the third tier. At the club he was converted into a left back, and contributed with 26 appearances (play-offs included) during the 2019–20 campaign, as his side achieved promotion to Segunda División.

Ozkoidi made his professional debut at the age of 30 on 19 September 2020, coming on as a late substitute for Jaime Sánchez in a 1–2 away loss against Rayo Vallecano. He scored his first professional goal the following 16 April, netting the opener in a 2–2 draw at CF Fuenlabrada.

On 8 July 2021, after suffering relegation, Ozkoidi moved to SD Amorebieta.

References

External links

1990 births
Living people
Spanish footballers
Footballers from San Sebastián
Association football defenders
Segunda División players
Segunda División B players
Tercera División players
Real Sociedad B footballers
SD Eibar footballers
Real Unión footballers
CE Sabadell FC footballers
SD Amorebieta footballers
Antiguoko players